Leny Marenbach (20 December 1907 – 26 January 1984) was a German film actress. She was a leading German actress of the Nazi era, appearing in films such as the biopic Friedemann Bach. After the Second World War, she appeared in several DEFA roles.

Selected filmography
 If We All Were Angels (1936)
 Der Etappenhase (1937)
 Alarm in Peking (1937)
 The Model Husband (1937)
 Five Million Look for an Heir (1938)
 Target in the Clouds (1939)
 Marriage in Small Doses (1939)
 Central Rio (1939)
 Mistake of the Heart (1939)
 Woman Made to Measure (1940)
 What Does Brigitte Want? (1941)
 Friedemann Bach (1941)
 Wild Bird (1943)
 The Big Number (1943)
 How Do We Tell Our Children? (1949)

References

Bibliography 
 Schulte-Sasse, Linda. Entertaining the Third Reich: Illusions of Wholeness in Nazi Cinema.  Duke University Press, 1996.

External links 
 

1907 births
1984 deaths
German film actresses
Actors from Essen
20th-century German actresses